Satwinder Kaur Dhaliwal (born 17 June 1953) is a political and social worker and a Member of Parliament elected from the Ropar constituency in the Indian  state of Punjab being a Shiromani Akali Dal candidate.

Early life
Satwinder was born on 17 June 1953 in the village of Babyal which comes under district Ambala in the Indian state of Haryana. She married Sardar Rajinder Singh Dhaliwal on 13 July 1975 and has two sons and a daughter.

Education
Satwinder completed her M.A in History and Political Science and B.Ed from Panjab University, Chandigarh.

Career
She has been a member of Shiromani Akali Dal since 1996. 
She was first elected to the 11th Lok Sabha in 1997 where she served as a Member on the Committee on Agriculture. In 1998, she was elected to the 12th Lok Sabha and served as 
 Member, Committee on Railways
 Member, Committee on Members of Parliament Local Area Development Scheme
 Member, Consultative Committee, Ministry of Social Justice and Empowerment

References

India MPs 1998–1999
Women in Haryana politics
Articles created or expanded during Women's History Month (India) - 2014
Panjab University alumni
People from Ambala district
Shiromani Akali Dal politicians
1953 births
Living people
20th-century Indian women politicians
20th-century Indian politicians
India MPs 1996–1997
Lok Sabha members from Punjab, India
People from Rupnagar district